Magdeburg-Sudenburg station is the most westerly railway station in Magdeburg, capital city of Saxony-Anhalt, Germany, located in the Sudenburg district.

It was opened for passenger and freight traffic in 1872. In 1932, a connecting curve was created between Sudenburg and Buckau stations. An adjacent container station was put into operation in 1967. After the fall of the Berlin Wall in 1990, this was no longer needed. Since 22 June 2003, the station has been controlled by the electronic signal box of the main station. In June/July 2014, extensive track renewal work was carried out.

References

Sudenburg
Railway stations in Germany opened in 1872
1872 establishments in Prussia